Courseulles was a railway station in Courseulles-sur-Mer at the end of the CF Caen-Mer, terminus of trains from Caen and Luc-sur-Mer.

The station and extension of the line opened in July 1876 and doubling of the track with the addition of a third rail for  gauge trains (Chemins de fer du Calvados) in 1900.  The station closed in 1952.

The station was situated Place du 6 Juin (current name) next to the Hôtel de Paris and the fishing harbour on the Seulles. the standard gauge railway ended whilst the  gauge line continued to Bayeux.

Defunct railway stations in Calvados
Railway stations in France opened in 1876
Railway stations closed in 1952